Deborah Mary Sellin (born 1 October 1964) is a Church of England priest serving as Bishop of Southampton, a suffragan bishop in the Diocese of Winchester, and acting as diocesan Bishop of Winchester.

Early life and education
Sellin is originally from Scotland, and was born in Dumfries on 1 October 1964. She studied at the University of St Andrews, graduating with an undergraduate Master of Arts (MA Hons) degree in 1986. She worked a manager in the National Health Service (NHS) and then as a family and children's worker. She trained for ordination with the Southern Theological Education and Training Scheme between 2004 and 2007.

Ordained ministry
Sellin was ordained as a deacon at Petertide 2007 (1 July), ordained as a priest at the Petertide following (28 June 2008) – both times by Christopher Hill, Bishop of Guildford, at Guildford Cathedral – and served all her parish ministry in the Diocese of Guildford. She was a Non-Stipendiary Minister at St Saviour, Guildford, from 2007 to 2010, then Vicar of Wonersh from 2010 to 2019 and also Area Dean of Cranleigh from 2015 to 2019. In 2018 she was made an Honorary Canon of Guildford Cathedral.

Episcopal ministry
In April 2019, it was announced that Sellin would be the next Bishop of Southampton; she legally took up her role on 3 July 2019, the day of her consecration
 by Justin Welby, Archbishop of Canterbury, at St Paul's Cathedral.

On 20 May 2021 it was reported that Tim Dakin, Bishop of Winchester, had "stepped back" as diocesan bishop for six weeks, in light of the threat of a diocesan synod motion of no confidence in his leadership. David Williams, Bishop of Basingstoke, the other suffragan bishop, also "stepped back" (he was said to be in sympathy with the protesters) and Sellin served as acting diocesan bishop. The "stepping back" was later extended and on 16 July Dakin announced that he would retire in February 2022; meanwhile, Sellin continues as acting diocesan bishop. On 11 January 2022 the Archbishop of Canterbury announced that Sellin would continue as acting diocesan bishop during the vacancy following Dakin's formal retirement on 6 February 2022.

References

1964 births
Living people
21st-century Church of England bishops
Bishops of Southampton
Women Anglican bishops
Alumni of the University of St Andrews